Sir Hans Sloane, 1st Baronet  (16 April 1660 – 11 January 1753), was an Irish physician, naturalist, and collector, with a collection of 71,000 items which he bequeathed to the British nation, thus providing the foundation of the British Museum, the British Library, and the Natural History Museum, London. He was elected to the Royal Society at the age of 24. Sloane travelled to the Caribbean in 1687 and documented his travels and findings with extensive publications years later. Sloane was a renowned medical doctor among the aristocracy, and was elected to the Royal College of Physicians at age 27. Though he is credited with the invention of chocolate milk, it is more likely that he learned the practice of adding milk to drinking chocolate while living and working in Jamaica. Streets and places were later named after him, including Hans Place, Hans Crescent, and Sloane Square in and around Chelsea, London – the area of his final residence – and also Sir Hans Sloane Square in his birthplace in Northern Ireland, Killyleagh.

Early life and family 
Sloane was born into an Anglo-Irish family on 16 April 1660 at Killyleagh, a village on the south-western shores of Strangford Lough in County Down in Ulster, the northern province in Ireland. Hans Sloane was the seventh and last child of Alexander Sloane who died when Hans was six years old. Alexander Sloane was a collecting general of taxes for County Down and 1st Earl of Clanbrassil James Hamilton's agent. (c. 1618–1659), and brother to James Sloane, MP (1655–1704). It is said that Sarah Hicks (Hans's mother), was an English woman who moved to Killyleagh as Anne Carey's companion when she married James Hamilton. Sloane's paternal family had migrated from Ayrshire, in the south-west of Scotland, and settled in east Ulster under King James VI and I. The Sloane children, including Hans, were taken up by the Hamilton family and had much of their early tuition conducted within the Killyleagh Castle library. Out of Alexander's sons, only three reached adulthood: Hans, William, and James. The graveyards of Henry and John Sloane can be found in Killyleagh's parish courtyard; both brothers died in their childhood. The eldest brother James was elected a Member of Parliament for Roscommon and Killyleagh in 1692. John Sloane later became an MP of Thetford and a barrister of the Inner Temple, spending most of his time in London.

Like many other Scots 'Planters' in Ulster during the seventeenth-century, the Sloane name was almost certainly of Gaelic origin, Sloane probably being an anglicisation of Ó Sluagháin.

As a youth, Sloane collected objects of natural history and other curiosities. This led him to the study of medicine, which he did in London, where he studied botany, materia medica, surgery and pharmacy. His collecting habits made him useful to John Ray and Robert Boyle.  After four years in London he travelled through France, spending some time at Paris and Montpellier, and stayed long enough at the University of Orange-Nassau to take his MD degree there in 1683; he was hired as an assistant to prominent physician Thomas Sydenham who gave the young man valuable introductions to practice. He returned to London with a considerable collection of plants and other curiosities, of which the former were sent to Ray and utilised by him for his History of Plants.

Voyage to the Caribbean and the creation of chocolate milk 

Sloane was elected to the Royal Society in 1685. In 1687, he became a fellow of the College of Physicians, and the same year went to Jamaica aboard  as personal physician to the new Governor of Jamaica, the 2nd Duke of Albemarle. Albemarle died in Jamaica the next year, 1688, so Sloane's visit lasted only fifteen months.

During his time in the Caribbean, Sloane visited several islands and collected more than 1,000 plant specimens as well as large supplies of cacao and Peruvian bark from which he later extracted quinine to treat eye ailments. Sloane noted about 800 new species of plants, which he catalogued in Latin in his Catalogus Plantarum Quae in Insula Jamaica Sponte Proveniunt (Catalogue of Jamaican Plants), published in 1696. His first writings about his trip appeared in the Philosophical Transactions of the Royal Society, in which Sloane described Jamaican plants such as the Pepper Tree and the coffee-shrub, alongside accounts of the earthquakes that struck Lima in 1687 and Jamaica in 1687/1688 and 1692. In Sloane's work, Natural History of Jamaica, he describes for the Queen of England the Black ethnomusic of Jamaica.

Sloane married Elizabeth Langley Rose, the widow of Fulke Rose of Jamaica, and daughter of Alderman John Langley, a wealthy heiress of sugar plantations in Jamaica worked by slaves. The couple had three daughters, Mary, Sarah and Elizabeth, and one son, Hans; only Sarah and Elizabeth survived infancy. Sarah married George Stanley of Paultons and Elizabeth married Charles Cadogan, who became 2nd Baron Cadogan. Once back in Britain, income from Sloane's career as a physician and his London property investments, coupled with Elizabeth's inheritance, enabled Sloane to build his substantial collection of natural history artefacts in the following decades. Sloane additionally had investments in the Royal African and South Sea Companies, both of which traded in slaves.

The Natural History Museum lists Sloane as the inventor of drinking chocolate with milk. However, according to historian James Delbourgo, the Jamaicans were brewing “a hot beverage brewed from shavings of freshly harvested cacao, boiled with milk and cinnamon” as far back as 1494. Sloane encountered the cocoa bean while he was in Jamaica, where the local people drank it mixed with water, though he is reported to have found it nauseating. Many recipes for mixing chocolate with spice, eggs, sugar and milk were in circulation by the seventeenth century. Sloane may have devised his own recipe for mixing chocolate with milk, though if so, he was probably not the first. (Some sources credit Daniel Peter as the inventor in 1875, using condensed milk; other sources point out that milk was added to chocolate centuries earlier in some countries.) By the 1750s, a Soho grocer named Nicholas Sanders claimed to be selling Sloane's recipe as a medicinal elixir, perhaps making "Sir Hans Sloane's Milk Chocolate" the first brand-name milk chocolate drink. By the nineteenth century, the Cadbury Brothers sold tins of drinking chocolate whose trade cards also invoked Sloane's recipe.

In 1707 Sloane listed the variety of punishments inflicted on slaves in Jamaica. For rebellion, slaves were usually punished "by nailing them down to the ground ... and then applying the fire by degrees from the feet and hands, burning them gradually up to the head, whereby their pains are extravagant." For lesser crimes, castration or mutilation ("chopping off half the foot") was the norm. And as for negligence, slaves "are usually whipt ... after they are whipt till they are raw, some put on their skins pepper and salt to make them smart; at other times their masters will drip melted wax on their skins, and use very exquisite torments."

Society physician 

Sloane started his own practice in 1689 at 3 Bloomsbury Place, London, Sloane worked among the upper classes where he was viewed as fashionable; he built a large practice which became lucrative. The physician served three successive sovereigns: Queen Anne, George I, and George II.

There was some criticism of Sloane during his lifetime as a mere "virtuoso", an undiscriminating collector who lacked understanding of scientific principles. One critic stated that he was merely interested in the collection of knick-knacks, and another called him the "foremost toyman of his time". Sir Isaac Newton described Sloane as "a villain and rascal" and "a very tricking fellow". Some believed that his true achievement was in making friends in high society and with important political figures, rather than in science. Even as a physician, he did not get a great deal of respect from many, being seen as primarily a seller of medications and a collector of curios. Sloane's only medical publication, an Account of a Medicine for Soreness, Weakness and other Distempers of the Eyes (London, 1745), was not published until its author was in his eighty-fifth year and had retired from practice.

In 1716 Sloane was created a baronet, making him the first medical practitioner to receive a hereditary title. In 1719 he became president of the Royal College of Physicians, holding the office for sixteen years. In 1722 he was appointed physician-general to the army, and in 1727 first physician to George II.

He was elected president of Royal College of Physicians in 1719 and served in that role until 1735. He became secretary to the Royal Society in 1693, and edited its Philosophical Transactions for twenty years. In 1727 he succeeded Sir Isaac Newton as president. He retired from the Society at the age of eighty.

Sloane's role as First Secretary and later President of the Royal Society, a period which included his revitalising editorship of the Philosophical Transactions, permitted Sloane little time for progressing his own scientific research, which led to the criticism of Sloane as a mere "virtuoso".

Aside from his service as Royal Physician, Sloane's true achievement during his time at the Royal Society was in acting as a conduit between the worlds of science, politics and high society.

Sloane's time in France at the beginning of his career later enabled him to fulfil the role of intermediary between British and French scientists, fostering the sharing of knowledge between the two countries at the height of the Age of Enlightenment. Notables from that period who visited Sloane to view his collection include the Swiss anatomist Albrecht von Haller, Voltaire, Benjamin Franklin and Carl Linnaeus.

In 1745, at the age of eighty-five, and after having retired from medical practice, Sloane published his first medical work, Account of a Medicine for Soreness, Weakness and other Distempers of the Eyes (London, 1745).

During his life, Sloane was a correspondent of the French Académie Royale des Sciences and was named foreign associate in 1709, in addition to being a foreign member of the academies of science in Prussia, Saint Petersburg, Madrid and Göttingen.

Charity work
Sloane helped out at Christ's Hospital from 1694 to 1730 and donated his salary back to that institution. He also supported the Royal College of Physicians' dispensary of inexpensive medications and operated a free surgery every morning.

He was a founding governor of London's Foundling Hospital, the nation's first institution to care for abandoned children. Inoculation against smallpox was required for all children in its care; Sloane was one of the physicians of that era who promoted inoculation as a method to prevent smallpox, using it on his own family and promoting it to the royal family.

The British Museum and Chelsea Physic Garden 

Sloane's purchase of the manor of Chelsea, London, in 1712, provided the grounds for the Chelsea Physic Garden.

Over his lifetime, Sloane collected over 71,000 objects: books, manuscripts, drawings, coins and medals, plant specimens and others. His great stroke as a collector was to acquire in 1702 (by bequest, conditional on paying of certain debts) the cabinet of curiosities owned by William Courten, who had made collecting the business of his life.

When Sloane retired in 1741, his library and cabinet of curiosities, which he took with him from Bloomsbury to his house in Chelsea, had grown to be of unique value. He had acquired the extensive natural history collections of William Courten, Cardinal Filippo Antonio Gualterio, James Petiver, Nehemiah Grew, Leonard Plukenet, the Duchess of Beaufort, Adam Buddle, Paul Hermann, Franz Kiggelaer and Herman Boerhaave.

Death and legacy

In his final year, Sir Hans Sloane suffered from a disorder with some paralysis. He died on the afternoon of 11 January 1753 at the Manor House, Chelsea, and was buried on 18 January in the south-east corner of the churchyard at Chelsea Old Church with a memorial inscribed as follows:To the memory of SIR HANS SLOANE BART President of the Royal Society, and of the College of Physicians; who in the year of our Lord 1753, the 92d of his age, without the least pain of body and with a conscious serenity of mind, ended a virtuous and beneficent life. This monument was erected by his two daughters ELIZA CADOGAN and SARAH STANLEY

His grave is shared with his wife Elisabeth who died in 1724.

On his death he bequeathed his books, manuscripts, prints, drawings, flora, fauna, medals, coins, seals, cameos and other curiosities to the nation, on condition that Parliament should pay his executors £20,000, far less than the value of the collection, estimated at £80,000 or greater by some sources and at over £50,000 by others. The bequest was accepted on those terms by an act passed the same year, and the collection, together with George II's royal library, and other objects. A significant proportion of this collection was later to become the foundation for the Natural History Museum. When Sloane wrote his will not only did he say he wanted to sell his work to the Parliament for 20,000 pounds, he also stated that he wanted his work to be seen by anyone who wanted to see it.  The Curators thought that only scholars and the upper class were allowed to see the collection. They weren't comfortable with the idea that the lower class was able to come to the museum and look at the collection because they didn't think that lower class citizens were worthy. The Curators believed that learning was a privilege that only the upper class had.

He also gave the Society of Apothecaries the land of the Chelsea Physic Garden which they had rented from the Chelsea estate since 1673.

A life-size statue of Sloane was erected in the town square of Killyleagh, the town in which he was born.

Controversy
In August 2020 a bust of Sloane in the British Museum's Enlightenment Gallery was moved by the museum. The decision came as part of that year's wave of removals of monuments to those who had benefited from slavery. History Ireland editor Tony Canavan, writing of the decision and observing the fact that the Sloane family had moved to Ireland from Scotland during the Tudor conquest of Ireland, noted that "the fact that Sloane came from a Scots-Irish family who benefited from a different kind of plantation, following the expulsion of natives and the confiscation of their land, [which seemed] never to have been an issue".

Places named after Sloane

Sloane Square, Sloane Street, Sloane Avenue, Sloane Grammar School and Sloane Gardens in the Royal Borough of Kensington and Chelsea are named after Sloane. His first name is given to Hans Street, Hans Crescent, Hans Place and Hans Road, all of which are also situated in the Royal Borough.

Plants and animals named after Sloane 

 Sloanea, a plant genus, was named after him by Linnaeus.
 Urania sloanus, a species of moth.
 Spondylurus sloanii, a species of lizard, was named in his honour by Daudin.
 Chauliodus sloani, a species of deep sea fish found across the world.

See also
 British Library Leyden Medical Dissertations Collection
 George Edwards
 Levinus Vincent
 Thomas Thistlewood
 List of presidents of the Royal Society

Notes

References

Bibliography 

 
 
  
 
 
 Lyons, J. 2008. p. 53 – 54. The Life and Times of a famous Ulsterman. Copeland Report for 2008. Copeland Bird Observatory

Further reading
 Jenny Uglow, "Collecting for the Glory of God" (review of James Delbourgo, Collecting the World:  Hans Sloane and the Origins of the British Museum, Belknap Press/Harvard University Press, 2017), The New York Review of Books, vol. LXIV, no. 15 (12 October 2017), pp. 34–36.

Ortolja-Baird, Alexandra. 2021. “Chaos naturae et artis: Imitation, Innovation and Improvisation in Sir Hans Sloane’s library. Part Two”. Library and Information History.
Ortolja-Baird, Alexandra. 2020. “Chaos naturae et artis: Imitation, Innovation and Improvisation in Sir Hans Sloane’s library. Part One”. Library and Information History.

External links 

 Reconstructing Sloane: Consortium for Sloane research

 "Index to the Sloane manuscripts in the British Museum", in the British Museum in various formats, at Archive.org
 A Voyage… on Botanicus
 Catalogus Plantarum...on Botanicus
 The Sloane Printed Books Catalogue
 Sloane Correspondence Online
 Sloane Letters Blog
 "Voyage to the Islands: Hans Sloane, Slavery and Scientific Travel in the Caribbean", John Carter Brown Library online exhibition 
 British Museum: Sir Hans Sloane

1660 births
1753 deaths
17th-century Irish medical doctors
18th-century English medical doctors
18th-century Irish medical doctors
Baronets in the Baronetage of Great Britain
Botanists active in the Caribbean
Fellows of the Royal Society
Honorary members of the Saint Petersburg Academy of Sciences
17th-century Irish botanists
Irish people of Scottish descent
Museum founders
People associated with the British Museum
People from County Down
People from Killyleagh
Pre-Linnaean botanists
Presidents of the Royal College of Physicians
Presidents of the Royal Society
Burials at Chelsea Old Church
Monuments and memorials removed during the George Floyd protests